Storage World Conference (sometimes called SWC) was a conference for data storage professionals in the United States.  Associated with the Association of Storage Networking Professionals, SWC was held from 2001 through 2006.

The event was oriented towards end users of data storage equipment and software, and included a professional certification program to encourage attendance at educational sessions.

Data storage conferences